Carlos Martínez Fernández (born 13 November 1980) is a Spanish retired footballer who played as a left winger, and the current as assistant manager of CD Leganés.

Football career
Born in Llerena, Badajoz, Extremadura, Martínez only played amateur football well into his 20s. In 2007, he joined Segunda División B side CD Leganés, being a regular starter for the club during his three-year spell.

On 28 July 2010, Martínez signed for AD Alcorcón, newly promoted to Segunda División. He made his professional debut on 29 August of that year at the age of 29, coming on as a second-half substitute for goalscorer Fernando Sales in a 1–1 away draw against Albacete Balompié.

Martínez scored his first and only goal in division two on 10 April 2011, netting his team's fourth in a 4–1 away routing of Córdoba CF. In July of the following year, after being sparingly used, he returned to his former side Leganés, scoring a career-best 11 goals in his first season and helping the team achieve promotion in his second.

Martínez retired in 2015, aged 34, after featuring regularly for third division side CF Fuenlabrada. Shortly after retiring, he started working as a fitness coach in Atlético Madrid's youth setup, before moving to China and Saudi Arabia.

On 8 July 2019, Martínez returned to Lega after being named Luis Cembranos' assistant in the B-team. He moved to the first team after Cembranos took over the main squad in an interim manner, but remained in the staff after the appointment of Javier Aguirre.

Personal life
Martínez's younger brother Robert was also a footballer. A central midfielder, he never appeared in any higher than the third division.

References

External links

1980 births
Living people
People from Campiña Sur (Badajoz)
Sportspeople from the Province of Badajoz
Spanish footballers
Footballers from Extremadura
Association football wingers
Segunda División players
Segunda División B players
Tercera División players
Atlético Madrid C players
Getafe CF footballers
Getafe CF B players
CD Leganés players
AD Alcorcón footballers
CF Fuenlabrada footballers